Coomera Anglican College is an independent Anglican co-educational early learning, primary and secondary day school ng Centre on the same campus. The College is located on Days Road in Upper Coomera, Queensland, Australia.

Founded in 1997 and operated by the Anglican Diocese of Brisbane, the College caters for students from earning learning, Prep to Year 12.

Overview

Coomera Anglican College bases its ethos on the twin foundations of the Anglican Church of Australia and 'imagine Listen Respect' (iLR) which is its values framework. These inform and drive all aspects of the College including its Teaching and Learning Framework (including the Habits of Mind system) and the self-driven behaviour management system called the Raise Responsibility system.

A major feature of the College is its approach to the use of technology. This is aimed at providing a consistent, regulated and educationally focussed incorporation of technology throughout the phases of primary and secondary education. In the Junior and Senior Secondary Schools this takes the form of a 1 to 1 laptop scheme called eMind. In the Primary School the focus is on providing a high availability of ICTs with a significant use of interactive whiteboard technologies.

Leadership
The current principal is Dr Mark Sly. The current Deputy Principal (Strategy and Innovation) is Virginia Warner. The current Head of Primary is Carolyn Thistlethwaite. The current Head of Junior Secondary is Greg Golder. The current Head of Secondary and Deputy Principal is Mark Heaney. The Director of Early Learning is Jenny Rees. Other key staff members include the Business Manager, David Dobbie, the Head of Teaching and Learning Processes, Alex Delaforce, and the current Head of Senior Schooling, John Campbell.

House system
Coomera Anglican College has four houses;

All members of the same family are placed in the same house. Each house is named after a person who had a part in the foundation of the school.

Notable alumni
 Kimberly Birrell, an Australian tennis player.
 Taylor Smith, an Australian rules footballer who began her career with the Gold Coast Suns. Following the 2020 AFLW season, Smith moved to the Brisbane Lions, where she became a premiership player in the 2021 AFLW grand final winning team. 
 Jade Wall, who played for Australia in the Tokyo Olympics, hitting Australia's first home run for the 2021 Games against Mexico in the Opening Rounds.

See also 

 List of schools in Queensland
 List of Anglican schools in Australia

References

External links
Coomera Anglican College's website

Anglican primary schools in Queensland
Educational institutions established in 1997
Anglican high schools in Queensland
Schools on the Gold Coast, Queensland
1997 establishments in Australia